Ronald Alexander (born 15 August 1993) is an Indonesian badminton player specializes in doubles. He is joined the Jaya Raya Jakarta badminton club in 2008, and moved to Jaya Raya Suryanaga Surabaya in 2011.

Achievements

BWF World Junior Championships 
Boys' doubles

Mixed doubles

Asian Junior Championships 
Boys' doubles

BWF World Tour (1 runner-up) 
The BWF World Tour, which was announced on 19 March 2017 and implemented in 2018, is a series of elite badminton tournaments sanctioned by the Badminton World Federation (BWF). The BWF World Tours are divided into levels of World Tour Finals, Super 1000, Super 750, Super 500, Super 300 (part of the HSBC World Tour), and the BWF Tour Super 100.

Mixed doubles

BWF Grand Prix (3 titles, 1 runner-up) 
The BWF Grand Prix had two levels, the BWF Grand Prix and Grand Prix Gold. It was a series of badminton tournaments sanctioned by the Badminton World Federation (BWF) which was held from 2007 to 2017.

Men's doubles

Mixed doubles

  BWF Grand Prix Gold tournament
  BWF Grand Prix tournament

BWF International Challenge/Series (1 title, 3 runners-up) 
Men's doubles

Mixed doubles

  BWF International Challenge tournament
  BWF International Series tournament

Performance timeline

National team 
 Junior level

Individual competitions 
 Junior level

 Senior level

Record against selected opponents 
Mixed doubles results with Melati Daeva Oktaviani against World Superseries finalists, World Superseries Finals semifinalists, World Championships semifinalists, and Olympic quarterfinalists.

  Lu Kai & Huang Yaqiong 2–0
  Xu Chen & Ma Jin 0–2
  Joachim Fischer Nielsen & Christinna Pedersen 0–1
  Reginald Lee Chun Hei & Chau Hoi Wah 1–1
  Muhammad Rijal & Vita Marissa 1–1
  Tontowi Ahmad & Liliyana Natsir 0–1
  Ko Sung-hyun & Kim Ha-na 0–2

References 

1993 births
Living people
People from Bitung
Sportspeople from North Sulawesi
Indonesian male badminton players
Indonesian Christians